Andrew Mueller is an Australian-born, London-based journalist and author. He is a contributing editor at Monocle, and also regularly writes for The Independent, The Independent on Sunday, The Financial Times, Esquire, The Guardian, Arena, The Times, Uncut, High Life, Harper's Bazaar, New Humanist, The Quietus, eMusic, and openDemocracy.net. He is the author of Rock & Hard Places, I Wouldn't Start From Here, It's Too Late To Die Young Now, and was a contributing editor to the fifth edition of Robert Young Pelton's The World's Most Dangerous Places. He was Reviews Editor for Melody Maker 1991 to 1993.

Andrew Mueller was quoted in Richard Dawkins' book, The God Delusion:

He is also the frontman of UK-based alt-country band The Blazing Zoos, whose debut album, "I'll Leave Quietly", was released in 2010.

He is a patron of Humanists UK.

Collaborations

 the North Sea Scrolls (with Luke Haines and Andrew Mueller) — 2012

Publications 

 I Wouldn't Start From Here: The 21st Century And Where It All Went Wrong (2008)
 Rock & Hard Places: Travels to Backstages, Frontlines and Assorted Sideshows (2012)
 It's Too Late To Die Young Now: Misadventures in Rock And Roll (2014)
 Carn: The Game, and the Country that Plays it (2019)

References

External links
 Official Site -  www.andrewmueller.net
 "Andrew Mueller" at guardian.co.uk
 The Blazing Zoos at MySpace

Living people
People from Wagga Wagga
Year of birth missing (living people)
Australian journalists